Aleksandar Ćirković (born 21 September 2001) is a Serbian footballer who plays as a left winger for Russian side Krylia Sovetov.

Club career
Born in Smederevska Palanka, Ćirković represented FC Admira Wacker Mödling, SC Perchtoldsdorf and ASV Vösendorf as a youth. He first appeared as a senior with Admira's reserves on 5 May 2019, coming on as a second-half substitute in a 0–4 Regionalliga home loss against ASK Ebreichsdorf.

Ćirković scored his first senior goal on 7 June 2019, netting the opener in a 1–1 away draw against SK Rapid Wien II. He made his first team debut on 11 September of the following year, starting in a 1–4 loss at SK Rapid Wien.

On 2 February 2021, after featuring rarely in the main squad, Ćirković was loaned to Serbian SuperLiga side FK Mačva Šabac for the remainder of the season. He scored his first professional goal on 7 March, netting his team's third in a 3–1 home win over FK Proleter Novi Sad, but was unable to avoid the club's relegation.

On 20 July 2021, Ćirković moved to Spain and signed a three-year contract with Primera División RFEF side Gimnàstic de Tarragona. He terminated his contract on 22 December, after failing to feature a single minute for the club.

On 26 August 2022, Ćirković signed a four-year contract with Krylia Sovetov in Russia.

Career statistics

References

External links

2001 births
People from Smederevska Palanka
Living people
Serbian footballers
Serbia under-21 international footballers
Association football wingers
FC Admira Wacker Mödling players
FK Mačva Šabac players
Gimnàstic de Tarragona footballers
FK Voždovac players
PFC Krylia Sovetov Samara players
Austrian Regionalliga players
Austrian Football Bundesliga players
Serbian SuperLiga players
Russian Premier League players
Serbian expatriate footballers
Serbian expatriate sportspeople in Austria
Expatriate footballers in Austria
Serbian expatriate sportspeople in Spain
Expatriate footballers in Spain
Serbian expatriate sportspeople in Russia
Expatriate footballers in Russia